Kalevi Ensio Suoniemi (14 July 1931 – 17 June 2010) was a Finnish gymnast. He competed at the 1956 Summer Olympics in all artistic gymnastics events and won a team bronze medal. His best individual result was ninth place on the pommel horse. Suoniemi won an individual bronze medal on the rings at the 1957 European Championships.

Suoniemi was born two months early because his mother had a bad fall while cleaning the floor. He survived owing to the help from his grandmother, who was a nurse and was nearby. He took up gymnastics in 1946 and had his first international competition in 1950. He married in 1953, and had a son Ari born in 1954 and a daughter Sirpa born in 1958. He retired from competitions in the early 1960s and in 1964–68 worked as a gymnastics coach. His trainees included Hannu Rantakari, who won an individual Olympic bronze medal in 1964. Later he worked in construction of electrical facilities. He was also active in local politics and took various posts at the Tampere City Council in 1960–1972 and 2000–2004.

References

External links

 
 

1931 births
2010 deaths
Finnish male artistic gymnasts
Olympic gymnasts of Finland
Gymnasts at the 1956 Summer Olympics
Olympic bronze medalists for Finland
Olympic medalists in gymnastics
Gymnasts from Tampere
Medalists at the 1956 Summer Olympics
20th-century Finnish people